Freed–Hardeman University is a private university associated with the Churches of Christ and located in Henderson, Tennessee. It is primarily undergraduate and residential, enrolling full-time students of traditional college age. The university also serves some commuting, part-time, and adult students on-campus and through distance-learning programs. The university offers a limited number of master's and doctoral level graduate programs including Bible, Business, Counseling and Education. Arts, science, and professional degrees are conferred.

The university is governed by a board of trustees, all of whom are required to be members of Churches of Christ. Courses are offered by 12 academic departments organized into six schools: Arts and Humanities, Biblical Studies, Business, Education, Sciences and Mathematics, and the Honors College.

Freed–Hardeman offers European study abroad programs based out of the FHU facility in Verviers, Belgium during the fall and spring semesters. A study abroad and Spanish-language immersion program is offered in Madrid, Spain, during most summer semesters.  Other opportunities include two and three week study programs in Israel, Costa Rica, New York City, Stratford, Canada, and Seoul, South Korea.

History

Freed–Hardeman traces its origin to the 1869 charter of a private high school and college for Henderson, the Henderson Male Institute. It was known at various times as the Henderson Masonic Male and Female Institute, West Tennessee Christian College and Georgie Robertson Christian College.  It was named Georgie Robertson Christian College after George Ann "Georgie" Robertson, the daughter of J. F. Robertson and his wife the former Lucy Alice Hamlett.  When Georgie died at age 21 her parents donated $5000 to West Tennessee Christian College in her memory and so the school was renamed after her.

In the spring term of 1907, Georgie Robertson Christian College closed down.  N. B. Hardeman, a Georgie Robertson Christian College alumnus, and A. G. Freed worked together to establish a new school, the National Teachers' Normal and Business College to fill the educational void created in Henderson by the closing of GRCC.  The NTNBC was incorporated on May 21, 1907, but classes did not start until the fall of 1908.  In 1919, it was renamed Freed–Hardeman College in honor of its founders. In February 1990, it became Freed–Hardeman University.

The college did not accept African-American students until 1964, when President Hubert A. Dixon stated black students would be admitted in response "to the mistake of accepting federal funds." The first black graduate was Elizabeth Saunders in 1967.

The university offers courses outside of the Henderson area in Memphis, Tennessee

The university was granted an exception to Title IX in 2016 which allows it to legally discriminate against LGBT students.

During the 2019–2020 academic year, the university celebrated its 150th Anniversary. In conjunction with the anniversary, a significant volume of university history (By the Grace of God: The Story of Freed–Hardeman University) was published.

Dormitories
All students at Freed–Hardeman University must live on campus unless approved by the administration. Generally these approvals are under special circumstances including, but not limited to, age, marriage, disability, or academic purposes. Students must be at least 22 years of age to apply for off campus housing unless otherwise approved by administration.

The university has five women's dormitories. Hall-Roland Hall (originally Oakland Hall) is the oldest residence hall, capable of housing 62. The ground floor houses Graduate Studies in Counseling and the Department of Behavioral and Consumer Sciences. H. A. Dixon Hall is a four-story dormitory opened in 1958. It can house 136 women. Thomas E. and LaVonne B. Scott Hall opened in 1971 and can house 152 women. In 1973 W. A. Bradfield Hall opened, housing 144 women. Porter-Terry Hall opened in 1977 and can house 156 women.

There are four men's dormitories. Paul Gray Hall was built in 1929 and can house 128 men on four floors and was re-opened in the fall of 2022 after renovations. Opened in 1970, George S. Benson Hall can accommodate 152 men. Farrow Hall opened in 1973 and has a capacity for 178 men. Sewell Hall opened on January 13, 2007, and can house 200 men. Upon the opening of Sewell Hall, L. L. Brigance Hall, which could house 78 men, was demolished in 2013.

Two additional residence halls were built in 2003: Tyler Residence Hall (for Women) and the Woods-East Residence Hall (for Men). These Residence halls are considered Privileged housing. Privileged housing is open only to upperclassmen. Students wishing to live in Privileged housing must complete an application and meet certain requirements including a 3.1 GPA. The rooms in these residence halls have four bedrooms, two bathrooms, a kitchen (with a microwave, oven, stove, and refrigerator), a washer and dryer, and a living room. Four students share this living space, each one with their own bedroom, and sharing a bathroom with one roommate.

Campus buildings

The Student Center opened in 1966 and houses a variety of food services and recreational rooms. The first floor houses the Burks Center. The center contains a food center, post office, Career Resource Center, Student Association office, Student Services office, and Office of Student Life and Development. The main cafeteria, Wallace-Gano Dining Hall, is located on the second floor.

Clayton Chapel, a red brick and stained glass building located on University Street, opened in 1992. It has a capacity of approximately 100. It may be reserved for devotionals and weddings.

The Brown-Kopel Business Center, was the start of many technology additions to the classroom that eventually began to be added to classrooms in other buildings. This is also where the majority of non-biblical classes are taken.

The Bulliner-Clayton Visual Arts Center opened in Fall 2007. Each year this building houses senior art exhibits, as well as many alum, local, and other art exhibits. This also is where the fine arts classes are held, except those that are music related, and can range from photography, painting, drawing, and graphic design.

The Brewer Sports Center is the athletic center of Freed–Hardeman University. This building has three racquetball courts, two basketball courts, a weight training room, walking track, and offices for the Athletic Department administration.

The Anderson Science Center was built in 2012. Money was given by alumnus Tom Anderson to create the facility which houses a large portion of the science department.

Future plans include an expansion and renovation of the Associates Science Center to facilitate and house the new nursing program.

Loyd Auditorium is the main auditorium on campus and is used for many of the activities on campus, including: Makin' Music, Daily Chapel, FHU Lectureships, sports banquet speakers, benefit dinner speakers, and the annual Homecoming Play. The auditorium can seat approximately 3,000 people.  It consists of a lower bowl as well as a balcony that is split into four sections and can be separated by large curtains.

The Hope Barber Shull Academic Resource Center, opened in 2016, houses the Loden-Daniel Library, KC's Coffeehouse, and the university tutoring center, named in honor of longtime librarian Hope Barber Shull.

Aside from the main buildings, Freed–Hardeman also has several recreational areas on campus. The weight room in Brewer's Sports Center is often overcrowded by the various student athletes, so many students go to the Main Street Student Gym a block west of Old Main. Across from Old Main is a campus theater named Crews Colbert Activity Center (or simply Crews). Crews has two theaters labeled "Maroon Theater" and "Gold Theater", and above the theaters is a large activity room used for open space activities and meetings. Next door to Crews is the Blackbox Theatre. This theatre is used for drama classes as well as all the plays put on by the theatre department each year aside from the Homecoming play.

Student life
Freed–Hardeman does not have fraternities and sororities in the traditional sense. Instead the university has co-ed social clubs. These social clubs are local only to Freed–Hardeman and have no connection to any national Greek system. These include Sigma Rho, Phi Kappa Alpha, Chi Beta Chi, Xi Chi Delta, and Omega Chi. Students participate in intramural sports, club meetings, and devotionals with their respective clubs. Sigma Rho and Phi Kappa Alpha are the only original social clubs remaining of the original 5 that were on campus, as well as being the two oldest. Sigma Rho has been on Campus for 104 years (celebrating their 100-year anniversary in 2012) and Phi Kappa Alpha has been on Campus for 77 years (celebrating their 75-year anniversary in 2014).

Rankings
U.S. News & World Report ranked Freed–Hardeman 35th among Southern master's degree-granting universities in its 2013 overall rankings. It also included the school in its separate affordability ranking ("Great Schools, Great Prices"), listing it 13th among Southern master's degree-granting universities.  The university reported a 44% acceptance rate of applicants for the fall 2012 semester.

The university is ranked among the "Absolute Worst Campuses for LGBTQ Youth" by Campus Pride.

Annual benefit dinner and speaker
Each year, on the first Friday in December, the university hosts a fundraising dinner featuring well-known speakers, such as Baseball Hall of Famer Cal Ripken Jr., former Presidents Gerald R. Ford and George H. W. Bush, TV personality Regis Philbin, retired General Norman Schwarzkopf, Olympic gold medalist Mary Lou Retton, Senator Elizabeth Dole, former US Senate Majority Leader and physician, Dr. Bill Frist, popular radio commentator Paul Harvey, NBC Today Show weatherman Willard Scott, NFL football player, commentator & actor Merlin Olsen, country comedian Jerry Clower, former Alabama head coach Gene Stallings, historic CBS-TV News anchor and reporter Walter Cronkite, former First Lady Barbara Bush, former NBC News Anchor and former Meet the Press moderator Tom Brokaw and most recently Emmy Award-winning comedian Tim Conway. On Saturday, May 15, 2010, Freed–Hardeman University announced that the featured speaker for the 2010 Annual Benefit Dinner would be former President George W. Bush. Robby Novak, aka Kid President, was an MC at this event

Athletics
The Freed–Hardeman athletic teams are called the Lions and Lady Lions. The university is a member of the National Association of Intercollegiate Athletics (NAIA), primarily competing in the Mid-South Conference (MSC) since the 2020–21 academic year. The Lions and Lady Lions previously competed in the American Midwest Conference from 2013–14 to 2019–20; and in the TranSouth Athletic Conference (TranSouth or TSAC) from 1996–97 to 2012–13; and in the Tennessee Collegiate Athletic Conference (TCAC) from 1986–87 to 1995–96.

Freed–Hardeman competes in 16 intercollegiate varsity sports: Men's sports include baseball, basketball, cross country, golf, soccer, tennis and track & field; while women's sports include basketball, cheerleading, cross country, golf, soccer, softball, tennis, track & field and volleyball.

Men's basketball
In 2014, men's basketball coach Jason Shelton was awarded the Don Meyer Award, presented annually to the top NAIA coach in college basketball.

Women's basketball
On March 20, 2018, the Lady Lions basketball team captured their first NAIA National Championship. The Lady Lions defeated Westmont 76–64.

Notable alumni and faculty
 Carl Bell, guitarist and songwriter for the band Fuel
 George S. Benson, president of Harding University
 John Brown, former CEO of Stryker Corporation
 T. Jeff Busby, Democratic congressman from Mississippi
 John Dale, minister
 John DeBerry, minister, and member of Tennessee House of Representatives
 Todd Farmer, screenwriter and actor (Jason X, My Bloody Valentine)
 Kerby Farrell, former MLB player for the Boston Braves (1943) and Chicago White Sox (1945)
 Dorsey B. Hardeman, son of university founder N. B. Hardeman; member of both houses of the Texas State Legislature; former mayor of San Angelo, Texas
 Jere Hargrove, member of Tennessee House of Representatives
 Hugo McCord, preacher and Bible scholar (taught at Freed–Hardeman)
 Dianne Odell, iron lung survivor
 Charles P. Roland, historian
 Rubel Shelly, author, minister, and former president of Rochester College
 Thomas B. Warren, FHU faculty member, Restoration theologian, and religious philosopher
 Sue Shelton White, national feminist leader and suffragist lawyer

References

External links
 
 Official website
 Official athletics website

 
Universities and colleges affiliated with the Churches of Christ
Private universities and colleges in Tennessee
Education in Chester County, Tennessee
Educational institutions established in 1869
Universities and colleges accredited by the Southern Association of Colleges and Schools
Buildings and structures in Chester County, Tennessee
1869 establishments in Tennessee